Red River Shore is a 1953 American Western film directed by Harry Keller and starring Rex Allen, Lyn Thomas and Slim Pickens.

The film's sets were designed by the art director Frank Hotaling.

Plot

Cast
 Rex Allen as Marshal Rex Allen  
 Koko as Rex's Horse  
 Slim Pickens as Deputy Slim Pickens  
 Lyn Thomas as Peggy Taylor  
 William Philpps as Ned Barlow  
 Douglas Fowley as Case Lockwood  
 Trevor Bardette as Frank Barlow  
 William Haade as Henchman Link 
 Emmett Vogan as Benjamin Willoughby, Banker  
 John L. Cason as Henchman Joe 
 Rayford Barnes as Henchman Pete  
 Virginia Carroll as Townswoman  
 Nolan Leary as Townsman 
 Frank O'Connor as Townsman  
 Jack Perrin as Work Crew Member  
 Ken Terrell as Henchman

References

Bibliography
 England, Jerry. Reel Cowboys of the Santa Susanas. ECHO Press, 2008.

External links
 

1953 films
1953 Western (genre) films
American Western (genre) films
Films directed by Harry Keller
Republic Pictures films
American black-and-white films
1950s English-language films
1950s American films